The 1994 Bromley Council election took place on 5 May 1994 to elect members of Bromley London Borough Council in London, England. The whole council was up for election and the Conservative party stayed in overall control of the council.

Background

Election result

Ward results

Lib Dem, Christopher (Chris) Gaster, elected

Labour - Ernest (Ernie) Dyer, elected

Labour - Robert (Rob) Yeldham, Elected

Labour - Peter Fookes, elected

Labour, Patricia (Pat) Mansfield, elected

Labour - Susan (Sue) Polydorou, elected

Labour - John Holbrook, elected

References

1994
1994 London Borough council elections